Zulmi is an Indian Hindi action drama crime film directed by Kuku Kohli, released on 16 April 1999. It stars Akshay Kumar and Twinkle Khanna.

Plot
Balraj Dutt is a bodyguard of Baba Thakur, who, while dying, makes Balraj promise to take care and protect his grandson Nihal.

Years later, Raj Malhotra and his sister are dining in a restaurant, after which they are attacked by the unknown man. The man tries to rape Raj's sister before she commits suicide.

Heartbroken by this incident, Raj sees a similar incident and saves a girl from molesters. This is observed by Balraj, who is impressed by Raj, who hires Raj as a bodyguard for his daughter Komal. She initially dislikes Raj and tries repeatedly to get him fired, but slowly she starts liking him after he saves her life from an attack. Things get complicated when he recognizes Nihal as the person who molested his sister. Now, Raj tries to kill Nihal.

Cast
 Akshay Kumar as Raj Malhotra 
 Twinkle Khanna as Komal Dutt
 Amrish Puri as Balraj Dutt
 Aruna Irani as Sumitra Dutt
 Dalip Tahil as Zoravar
 Deep Dhillon as Bakhtavar
 Arun Bakshi as Inspector Vikram
 Dara Singh as Baba Thakur
 Milind Gunaji as Nihal Thakur
 Rakhee Malhotra as Pooja Malhotra
 Ghanshyam Rohera as Pilot

Soundtrack
The music is composed by Dilip Sen-Sameer Sen and R. D. Burman, while the lyrics are penned by Gulshan Bawra.
 01 - "Teri Badmashiyan Aur Meri" - Asha Bhosle & Udit Narayan
 02 - "Bhool Se Humne Bhool Ki" (Happy)- Kumar Sanu & Asha Bhosle
 03 - "Shalu Ya Sheela" - Amit Kumar
 04 - "Mere Liye To Fit Hai Tu" - Amit Kumar & Asha Bhosle
 05 - "Sapne Mein Aake Loot Gaya" - Asha Bhosle *Music by: R. D. Burman
 06 - "Zulmi Toone Zulm Kiya" - Asha Bhosle
 07 - "Bhool Se Humne Bhool Ki" (Sad)- Asha Bhosle
 08 - "Bhool Se Humne Bhool Ki" - Instrumental

Reception

Collecting 37 lack nett on opening day, and a total of 2.74cr nett, the film failed to do well at the box office.

References

External links 
 

1990s Hindi-language films
1999 films
Films scored by Dilip Sen-Sameer Sen
1999 action films
Indian action films
Films set in Mumbai
Yash Raj Films films
Hindi-language action films
Films directed by Kuku Kohli